Svenskøya (English: "Swedish Island") is an island in Svalbard. It is the second largest island of Kong Karls Land with an area of 137 km².

Svenskøya is separated from Kongsøya by the strait Rivalensundet. The island is separated from Edgeøya and Barentsøya by the strait Olgastretet.

See also
 List of islands of Norway

References

 
Islands of Svalbard